A make-up artist, also called a makeup artist, and often shortened to MUA, is an artist whose medium is the human body, applying makeup and prosthetics on others for theatre, television, film, fashion, magazines and other similar productions including all aspects of the modeling industry. Awards given for this profession in the entertainment industry include the Academy Award for Best Makeup and Hairstyling, and entertainment industry awards such as the Emmy Awards, and the Golden Globes. In some countries professional licenses are required by agencies in order for them to hire the MUA. Bigger production companies have in-house makeup artists on their payroll although most MUA's generally are freelance and their times remain flexible depending on the project.

Makeup techniques

Fashion
Fashion makeup is used in magazine photography as well as on the fashion runway. Avant-garde makeup is also an applicable technique used for projects that require experimental themes. Fashion makeup is also commonly used in television and film ranging for the natural prime look to more sophisticated applications such as color balance.

Theatrical makeup
Stage makeup is used as a method in conjunction with stage lighting to highlight the actors' faces in order to make expressions visible to the audience from moderate distances.  This often includes defining the eyes and lips as well as the highlights and lowlights of the facial bones.

Special make-up effects (FX makeup)

The use of special effects techniques enhancing physical features to exhibit  as well as fantasy makeup. The use of prosthetics and plaster casting are also required for projects that entails non-human appearances. Accents such as theatrical blood and ooze are also techniques applicable to this type of makeup.

Airbrushing

An airbrush is a small air-operated device that sprays water-based makeup by a process of nebulization. Airbrushed makeup was used in Hollywood movies at least as early as the 1930s. Monte Westmore is sometimes credited with developing the technique for Gone With the Wind, but his brother Wally was using it at least five years earlier in Pre-Code films such as Murder at the Vanities. It has recently been re-popularized by the advent of HDTV and digital photography, where the camera focuses on higher depths of detail. Liquid foundations that are high in coverage but thin in consistency are applied with the airbrush for full coverage without a heavy build-up of product.

Bridal makeup
From ethnic, glamorous, to contemporary, makeup artists are an important part of wedding planning in Asia, Europe, Africa, North and Latin America.

High definition
This is an art which involves the use of light reflectors and ingredients such as minerals to give the skin a flawless finish. This was developed due to the further development of high definition mediums and the cost implications of airbrush makeup.

In Bollywood
In 1955 the Bollywood group Cine Costume Make-Up Artist & Hair Dressers' Association (CCMAA) created a rule that did not allow women to obtain memberships as makeup artists. However, in 2014 the Supreme Court of India ruled that this rule was in violation of the Indian constitutional guarantees granted under Article 14 (right to equality), 19(1)(g) (freedom to carry out any profession) and Article 21 (right to liberty). The judges of the Supreme Court of India stated that the ban on women makeup artist members had no "rationale nexus" to the cause sought to be achieved and was "unacceptable, impermissible and inconsistent" with the constitutional rights guaranteed to the citizens. The Court also found illegal the rule which mandated that for any artist, female or male, to work in the industry, they must have domicile status of five years in the state where they intend to work. In 2015 it was announced that Charu Khurana had become the first woman to be registered by the Cine Costume Make-Up Artist & Hair Dressers' Association.

In June 2014, the Cine Costume Make-Up Artist & Hair Dressers' Association (CCMAA) authorised an official protest on the movie set of Bang Bang! in protest of a foreign makeup artist, Daniel Bauer, working on the movie for its lead actress, Katrina Kaif. The CCMAA and 15 of its members protested on the movie set as Daniel Bauer was not registered with the Union, despite the Union banning foreign artists working in Bollywood. The issue was resolved with the CCMAA granting Daniel Bauer full membership.

Notable make-up artists

Kevyn Aucoin
 Rick Baker
 Way Bandy
 Sir John Barnett
 Bobbi Brown
 Linda Cantello
 Marco Castro
 John Chambers 
 Lon Chaney
 Lisa Eldridge
 Nina Flowers
 Joanne Gair
 Kelly Hanna
 Nikkie de Jager
 Huda Kattan
 Michael Maron
 Pat McGrath
 Jack Pierce
 Ve Neill
 Dick Smith
 Charlotte Tilbury
 Gucci Westman

References

External links

 Best bridal makeup artist in India

 BBC Blast - Becoming a makeup artist

 
Cosmetics people
Filmmaking occupations
Theatrical occupations
Stagecraft
Fashion occupations